Ilha de Itamaracá is a tropical island and municipality in Pernambuco, Brazil on the Atlantic Ocean. Itamaracá means "stone shaker" in Tupi, from the words itá ("stone") and mbara'ká ("shaker").  It is separated from the mainland by the Canal de Santa Cruz, a salt water channel both mouths of which are on the Atlantic Ocean, and is connected to the mainland by a long road bridge.

This is up from 16,000 in 2007, and reflects the increasing popularity of the island as a residential (rather than touristic) destination. It is located in the metropolitan area of Recife, the capital city of Pernambuco state, about an hour from Recife International Airport. The main activities of the population are fishing and, increasingly, tourism. It was awarded city status on 1 January 1959.

About two thirds of the island is covered in protected natural rain forest ('Mata Atlantica'), with most human occupation and development occupying a narrow strip along the ocean front white sandy beaches, that stretch for around 12 km (7.5 miles) along the eastern coast. These beaches are protected by a reef 3 km (2 miles) off the coast, that encircles the island on the ocean side, making the island waters shallow, safe, and warm. Year round temperatures typically vary in a narrow range of 26-31C (79-88F), with the rainy season (occasional heavy rains, not monsoon) in May to July. Building regulations since 1995 have limited the number of floors in buildings to 2, resulting in a complete absence of high-rise apartment complexes, and no industry is allowed on the island.

Geography
 State - Pernambuco
 Region - RMR (Recife)
 Boundaries - Goiana (N), Igarassu (S), Itapissuma (W), Atlantic ocean (E)
 Area - 
 Elevation - 
 Hydrography - Small coast rivers, most only running in the winter, lakes
 Vegetation - Atlantic forest, numerous fruit trees (incl mango, avocado, coconut, cashew, and many others), mangrove
 Climate - Hot tropical and dry
 Annual average temperature - 29C (84F)
 Main roads -  BR 101 (mainland), PE 35 and PE 01
 Distance to Recife - 38 km

History

In the early 1500s before Portuguese colonization, when under Dutch control, the island was the site of a trading post for furs and other native goods, and transhipment depot for Brazilwood. In 1516, was founded the first sugar cane mill in Portuguese America - the oldest still-inhabited, Portuguese settlement in America. The island at that time was occupied by various loosely related tribes of Tupi-Guarani native South American peoples. Later, the island became part of the Captaincy of Itamaracá (most of which today is occupied by the state of Paraiba) which took its name from the island, established by King John III of Portugal in 1534.    The chief economic activity in the following century and a half was sugar cane processing, in engenhos (sugar mills), and coconut production.  While Itamaracá was administratively separate, it operated as a political and economic subdivision of Pernambuco.  With the rise of the gold economy in the late 17th century, Itamaracá became economically isolated.

Itamaracá is reputed for having one of the first, if not the first, Jewish community in the Americas. In the Yosef Goldman Collection, there is a book titled Sefer Shefa Tal, a kabbalistic volume that was printed in Hanau, Germany, in 1612. It contains a handwritten statement of ownership by Rabbi Jacob Lagarto of a congregation in Tamarica, Brazil. Rabbi Lagarto came to Brazil as a young man and was the author of a volume of aphorisms (copies of which, evidently, no longer exist). The book is the only known physical link to this Jewish community, since there are no other known artifacts from it.

Tourist attractions

 Beaches and water sports 
 Forte Orange, first built by the Dutch in 1631 and rebuilt by the Portuguese in 1654 * Vila Velha, seat of the former Itamaracá Hereditary Captaincy (Church of Our Lady of the Conception, colonial houses)
 Sao Joao and Amparo "engenhos" (historic sugar mill and plantation complexes)
 Ibama's centre of sea mammals (Trichechus manatus)
 Nossa Senhora da Conceicao: Second oldest church in Brazil

Economy
The main economic activities in Itamaraca are based in tourism, fishing and local commerce.

Economic indicators

Economy by Sector
2006

Health indicators

Penal Facilities
Like many islands around the world, prisons were built there many years ago, (as many people could not swim at that time). Itamaracá island still has two prisons, which are nearing the end of a long term relocation program to a new facility being built near Itaquitinga on the mainland. The prisons are located on the leeward side of the island, away from the tourist areas, and have little impact other than the psychological awareness of their existence.

Gallery

See also
List of islands of Brazil
List of municipalities in Pernambuco

References

External links
Itamaracá island

Atlantic islands of Brazil
Populated coastal places in Pernambuco
Former Portuguese colonies
Municipalities in Pernambuco
Beaches of Brazil